Capital punishment in the District of Columbia has been abolished since 1981. However, a number of executions were carried out under the District's jurisdiction before then.

Before 1973, the District of Columbia was exclusively governed by Congress, which included establishing all local laws. Until 1962, the District of Columbia was the last jurisdiction in the United States with mandatory death sentences for first-degree murder (the last U.S. state with mandatory death sentences for first degree murder was Vermont). Mandatory death sentences were abolished by the HR5143 (PL87-423), signed into law by President John F. Kennedy on March 22, 1962. Rape was also a capital offense.

The D.C. capital punishment law was nullified by the Supreme Court decision in Furman v. Georgia in 1972 and formally repealed by the D.C. Council in 1981.

The first recorded execution in District of Columbia, was the hanging of James McGirk in 1802. Hanging was the method of execution used in the District until 1928, when it was replaced by the electric chair. The last execution under the authority of the District took place in 1957, when Robert Carter was executed. All executions were conducted at the D.C. Jail.

The president of the United States has sole pardoning power in the District.

Listing of non-federal executions in the District of Columbia - 1900-1957

References

Lists of people executed in the United States